Ascensión Martínez Salinas (born 20 February 2002), commonly known as Asun, is a Spanish footballer who plays as a forward for Valencia.

Club career
Asun started her career at Elche B.

References

External links
Profile at La Liga

2002 births
Living people
Women's association football forwards
Spanish women's footballers
Footballers from Elche
Sporting Plaza de Argel players
Valencia CF Femenino players
Primera División (women) players
Segunda Federación (women) players
Spain women's youth international footballers